Sytnykov is a Ukrainian surname. Notable people with the surname include: 

Anton Sytnykov (born 1991), Ukrainian footballer
Mykyta Sytnykov (born 2004), Ukrainian footballer

Ukrainian-language surnames